Sann Satt Naing (also spelled Sann Satt Naing; born 4 November 1997) is a Burmese footballer playing as a goalkeeper for Burmese club Yangon United. He was signed from the MFF Academy to the Yangon United senior team.

International

Club career

Yangon United
In September 2017, he played his first match for Yangon United in a 1 - 0 win over Hantharwady United. He had a clean sheet in his first appearance in Yangon United. He replaced the injured Kyaw Zin Htet.

Myanmar National Under-22 Football Team
He was the starting goalkeeper for the country's U-22 team in the 2017 South East Asian Games.

2019 South East Asian Games Best XI
He show good form in this tournament. So he became best goal keeper in the 2019 South East Asian Games.

References

1997 births
Living people
People from Yangon Region
Burmese footballers
Association football goalkeepers
Yangon United F.C. players
Footballers at the 2018 Asian Games
Asian Games competitors for Myanmar
Competitors at the 2019 Southeast Asian Games
Southeast Asian Games medalists in football
Southeast Asian Games bronze medalists for Myanmar